Horace Ellis (May 23, 1843 – June 27, 1867) served in the Union Army during the American Civil War. He received the Medal of Honor for his actions during the Battle of Globe Tavern.

Ellis was born in Mercer County, Pennsylvania. He joined the 7th Wisconsin Infantry from Chippewa Falls, Wisconsin in July 1861. He was detailed to the 4th US Artillery Regiment from February 1863 to January 1864. He was wounded at the Battle of White Oak Road, and mustered out in July 1865.

Ellis died in Eagle Point, Wisconsin, aged only 24, and was buried in O'Neil Creek Cemetery.

Medal of Honor citation
Citation:

The President of the United States of America, in the name of Congress, takes pleasure in presenting the Medal of Honor to Private Horace Ellis, United States Army, for extraordinary heroism on 21 August 1864, while serving with Company A, 7th Wisconsin Infantry, in action at Weldon Railroad, Virginia, for capture of flag of 16th Mississippi (Confederate States of America).

See also

List of American Civil War Medal of Honor recipients: A–F

References

External links

People of Wisconsin in the American Civil War
1843 births
1867 deaths
People from Chippewa Falls, Wisconsin
Union Army soldiers
United States Army Medal of Honor recipients
American Civil War recipients of the Medal of Honor